Kara Musa Pasha ("Musa Pasha the Courageous" in Turkish; died 1649) was an Ottoman soldier and statesman of Bosnian origin who was named grand vizier by Sultan Ibrahim I 16 September 1647 after Nevesinli Salih Pasha's execution, holding the office for only five days until 21 September. He also held the office of Kapudan Pasha (Grand Admiral of the Ottoman Navy) in 1647. He was trained in Enderûn.

His first meeting with sultan Murad IV was in 1630. Later on in his life, he became a member of Sublime Porte/Divan (the Ottoman government council) and was selected three times to serve as deputy of the Budin Eyalet. There in 1643, he reportedly received an endowment for the construction of the Musa-Pasha Mosque in Nova Kasaba, Bosnia and Herzegovina. During the Crete war campaign, after the death of the previous incumbent Koca Musa Pasha, Kara Musa Pasha received the title of Kapudan Pasha in 1647. When he invaded the city of Rethymno in Crete, he had a church there converted into a mosque, which still stands as "Kara Musa Pasha Mosque." However, because of lack of many successes, he was dismissed from the role of Kapudan Pasha soon afterwards.

Also while he was fighting in the war, the imperial seal signifying his promotion to grand vizier was sent to him by sea. After having received the news of his promotion, but not having yet received the seal, he was passed over for grand vizier because of the influence of Hezarpare Ahmet Pasha over the sultan, who instead chose Hezarpare Ahmet Pasha as grand vizier.

In the beginning of the same year of 1647, he had married Şekerpare Hatun, a lady in waiting and a favorite of the sultan, which was the very reason for his appointment as Grand Admiral.

In December 1647, Kara Musa Pasha was made the governor of Baghdad Eyalet. He held this post for just over a year until January 1649, when he was dismissed and returned to Constantinople. He was executed sometime that year on the orders of queen regent Kösem Sultan, in turn upon the advice of her advisers and grand vizier.

See also
 List of Ottoman Grand Viziers
 List of Kapudan Pashas

Footnotes

1649 deaths
Pashas
17th-century Grand Viziers of the Ottoman Empire
Year of birth unknown
People from Foča
Kapudan Pashas
Executed people from the Ottoman Empire
17th-century executions by the Ottoman Empire
People from the Ottoman Empire of Bosnian descent
Ottoman governors of Baghdad
Ottoman people of the Ottoman–Venetian Wars